Pakistan participated in the 1990 Asian Games in Beijing, China from  September 22, to October 7, 1990.

References

Nations at the 1990 Asian Games
1990
Asian Games